The Burdekin Dam, officially the Burdekin Falls Dam, is a concrete gravity dam with an uncontrolled spillway across the Burdekin River, located south west of Ayr, and Home Hill in North Queensland, Australia. Built for the purpose of irrigation, the reservoir is called Lake Dalrymple. Burdekin Dam is managed by SunWater. Water from the reservoir is also used to replenish downstream aquifers.

Location and features
The reservoir holds  at full capacity. The design allows for future storage capacity increases and potential for hydro-electricity generation. Plans are in place to increase the safety of this dam in an extreme rainfall event by increasing the spillway capacity. This project is scheduled for completion over the next 5 to 20 years.

The catchment area for the dam extends north to the Seaview Range west of Ingham, south to the Drummond Range near Alpha through the Suttor and Belyando Rivers, southeast to the coastal ranges west of Mackay, and west beyond Charters Towers to the Lolworth, Montgomery and Stopem Blockem Ranges through the Clarke River.

History
Construction of the dam began in 1984. It was completed by Leighton Contractors in 1987 and is the largest dam in the state, with a capacity four times that of Sydney Harbour. Burdekin Dam filled after the wet season in 1988.

Irrigation
The Burdekin River Irrigation Area was granted approval in 1980. It is Queensland's largest land and water conservation scheme.

Proposed hydroelectricity

Stanwell Corporation has begun a feasibility study into a proposed  hydroelectric power station below the Burdekin Dam wall. It is proposed it would be capable of producing  annually, enough to power more than 9,500 homes each year.

Boating
There are no boating restrictions, with a single boat ramp located near the dam wall. Water in the dam is often muddied with unsettled sediment long after the rains have washed it into the lake. This not only makes angling difficult but also means boating can be hazardous at high speeds due to the presence of submerged rocks.

Fauna and flora
The dam has been stocked with sleepy cod, sooty grunter and barramundi. Numerous other species are present naturally, including forktail catfish, spangled perch, eel-tailed catfish, long tom, golden perch and archer fish.
A Stocked Impoundment Permit is required to fish in the dam. Red-claw crayfish and freshwater crocodiles although not native to this river may also found in the dam. These were probably released by people who caught them from rivers of the Gulf of Carpentaria..  Saltwater crocodiles are commonly known to take cattle from the reaches of both Burdekin and Suttor river sections of  Lake Dalrymple reaches of the dam.

Awards 
In 2009 as part of the Q150 celebrations, the Burdekin Falls Dam was announced as one of the Q150 Icons of Queensland for its role as a "structure and engineering feat".

See also

List of dams and reservoirs in Queensland

References

External links
 Pictures- National Library of Australia
 More historical Photos from the NQ Dry Tropics
 Burdekin Dam Fishing Information & Map

Reservoirs in Queensland
Dams completed in 1987
1987 establishments in Australia
Dams in Queensland
North Queensland
Charters Towers Region
Whitsunday Region
Gravity dams
Burdekin River
Q150 Icons